The 2002 Furman Paladins football team was an American football team that represented Furman University as a member of the Southern Conference (SoCon) during the 2002 NCAA Division I-AA football season. In their first year under head coach Bobby Lamb, the Paladins compiled an overall record of 8–4 with a conference mark of 6–2, finishing tied for second in the SoCon. Furman advanced to the NCAA Division I-AA Football Championship playoffs, where they were upset by Villanova in the first round.

Schedule

References

Furman
Furman Paladins football seasons
Furman Paladins football